Law and Unity was a conservative political party in Armenia.

History
Following the 2003 Armenian parliamentary election, the party won 1.0% of the popular vote but no seats in the National Assembly. The party has not participated in any subsequent elections and has since dissolved.

See also

Politics of Armenia
Programs of political parties in Armenia

Conservative parties in Armenia
Political parties in Armenia
Political parties with year of establishment missing